Sami Garam (born 31 October 1967 in Helsinki) is a Finnish cook and writer of Hungarian descent.

The son of Károly and Sirkka Garam (née Saarikoski). Sami Garam's mother, Sirkka Garam, is a sister of the Finnish poet Pentti Saarikoski. Sami Garam's main profession is cooking, and he has worked as chef in many restaurants, receiving high acclaim for his food. Garam's other interest is literature, and he has written several books in Helsinki slang, including slang versions of classic Finnish novels and the first-ever Helsinki slang versions of Aku Ankka ("Donald Duck" in Finnish) and Asterix comic books.

Sami Garam has three children, two daughters (born 1991 and 1992) and a son (born 1995), and is married to Päivi Garam for over 15 years.

Bibliography
 Rotsi on mut byysat puuttuu (Aku Ankka album), 2000
 Snögeli ja seittemän snadii starbuu (Snow White), WSOY 2001
 Jörde-Juge (Der Struwwelper), 2001
 Stadilainen tsöge (cookbook), WSOY 2002
 Allu Stemun Seittemän broidii (Aleksis Kivi: Seven Brothers), WSOY 2003
 Daijulastooreja (Finnish folk stories), WSOY 2004
 Kessen rehukotsa (Asterix album), 2005
 Puolialaston kokki (Donald Duck cooking book), Sanoma Magazines Finland 2005
 Pidot Ankkalinnassa (Donald Duck cooking book), Sanoma Magazines Finland 2006
 gAstronominen keittokirja (gastronomical cook book) 2008

Sources
WSOY author gallery page for Sami Garam (in Finnish)

1967 births
Living people
Writers from Helsinki
Finnish writers
Finnish chefs
Finnish people of Hungarian descent